The Sketchersons are a sketch comedy troupe based in Toronto, Ontario.  They are winners of the 2007 Canadian Comedy Award for best Sketch Troupe, an award they had been nominated for each of the 3 years prior. The Sketchersons were again nominated for the award in 2008, 2009, 2010, and 2013.

The Sketchersons have performed across Canada and the United States, including at the 2005 and 2006 Montreal Fringe Festivals, the 2006 New York Fringe Festival, the 2008 Just For Laughs Sketch Comedy Gala in Toronto, the 2009 Chicago Sketch Comedy Festival, and at the 2012 JFL42 Festival. Members of the troupe are also active in Toronto's comedy scene and can be seen at various shows around the city including Laugh Sabbath, The Last Comedy Show and Projectproject amongst others.

Current Sketchersons

Matt Nadeau - Joined January 18, 2015
Gillian Bartolucci - Joined January 18, 2015
Marshall Lorenzo - Joined March 20, 2016 / Former Head Writer
Adele Marie Dicks - Joined March 20, 2016 
Colin Sharpe - Joined March 20, 2016 / Current Co-Head Writer
Samantha Adams - Joined March 20, 2016 
Alex Kolanko - Joined July 9, 2017 
Emily Richardson - Joined July 9, 2017 / Current Co-Head Writer
Erica Gellert  - Joined July 9, 2017
Tom Hearn  - Joined July 9, 2017 / Producer 
Aba Amuquandoh - Joined November 18, 2018
Ayaka Kinugawa - Joined January 6, 2019
Ajahnis Charley - Joined March 3, 2019
Chelsea Larkin - Joined March 3, 2019
Guy Bradford - Joined March 3, 2019
Jake Martin - Joined March 3, 2019 
Nicole Passmore - Joined March 3, 2019 
Patrick Murray - Joined March 3, 2019 
Gary Rideout Jr. - Founding Member/ Producer
Áine Davis -  Technical & Lighting Director

Sunday Night Live Alumni

Grant Cumming - Founding member
Dan Galea - Founding member
Holly Prazoff - Founding member
Shannon Beckner - Founding member
Tal Zimerman - Founding member; former news anchor
Craig Brown - Founding member
Bob Kerr - Founding member; former news anchor
Inessa Frantowski - Founding member
Pat Thornton - Founding member, former head writer
Fraser Young
Gilson Lubin
Nikki Payne
Jared Sales - former news anchor
Josh Saltzman - Joined July 3, 2007
Cole Osborne - Joined July 3, 2007; former news anchor
Laura Cilevitz - Joined July 3, 2007
Norm Sousa - Joined July 3, 2007; former head writer
Jason DeRosse - Joined July 3, 2007
Andy Hull - Joined July 3, 2007
Carly Heffernan - Joined Nov 6th, 2008
Alex Tindal - Joined Nov 6th, 2008
Sarah Hillier - Joined Nov 6th, 2008
Brendan Halloran - Joined Nov 6th, 2008; former news anchor/ head writer
Kevin Matviw - Joined August 15, 2010
Kaitlin Loftus - Joined March 7, 2011
Ian MacIntyre - Joined August 15, 2010
Kirsten Rasmussen - Joined January 20, 2013
Jon Blair - Joined Nov 6th, 2008; former head writer
Phil Moorhead - Joined March 7, 2011
Daryn McIntyre - Joined Nov 6th, 2008; former head Writer
Greg Chociej - Joined January 20, 2013
Alexandra Wylie - Joined March 7, 2011
Ann Pornel - Joined March 7, 2011
Mark Andrada - Joined July 18, 2004; former Technical and Lighting Director
Andy Auld - Joined March 7, 2011 - former Director/Producer
Jocelyn Geddie - Joined August 15, 2010 - Head Writer/Producer
Allison Hogg - Joined January 20, 2013 - Head Writer / Producer
Jeremy Woodcock - Joined January 20, 2013 - News Anchor
Joel Buxton - Joined March 7, 2011
Brandon Hackett - Joined January 20, 2013
Jonathan Langdon - Joined January 20, 2013
Greg Cochrane - Joined January 18, 2015
Carson Pinch - Joined January 18, 2015
Allana Reoch - Joined January 18, 2015
Tricia Black - Joined January 18, 2015
Lisa Gilroy - Joined March 20, 2016 
Georgia Brown - Technical & Lighting Director 
Alessandra Vite - Joined January 20, 2013/ Headwriter
Alanna McConnell - Technical & Lighting Director
Isabel Kanaan  - Joined July 9, 2017
Natalie Metcalfe - Joined July 9, 2017
Matt Folliott- Joined March 20, 2016
Celeste Yim  - Joined July 9, 2017
Tim Blair - Joined July 9, 2017
Kyah Green - Joined March 3, 2019

Sunday Night Live

The Sketchersons run the weekly stage show Sunday Night Live, which is modeled after Saturday Night Live which airs on NBC. Sunday Night Live began in Toronto in early 2004 at The Rivoli on Queen Street West, but only lasted for 2 shows before moving to the Poor Alex Theatre on Brunswick Street at Bloor, with hosts such as Amanda Walsh, Scott Thompson, and Snow. In 2005, The Poor Alex closed, and the show moved across the street to The Brunswick House, a popular bar for university students. Notable hosts from this stint at "The Brunny" include Colin Mochrie, WWE wrestler Chris Jericho and Royal Canadian Air Farce's Don Ferguson. From January to December 2007, the group had a successful run at the Diesel Playhouse. Hosts from that year included Toronto Mayor David Miller, Canadian Idol Ryan Malcolm, Tyler Stewart and Kevin Hearn (members of The Barenaked Ladies) and former Toronto Argonaut John Avery.

In January 2008, Sunday Night Live went on hiatus as the show's new, permanent venue was under renovation. In November 2008, Comedy Bar opened its doors as the Sketcherson's permanent home, and the cast (which expanded, adding 6 new members) has been writing a new show every week since. Hosts from this era have included famed stand-up comedian Andy Kindler, Kids in the Hall's Kevin McDonald, Greg Proops, wrestler Bret "The Hitman" Hart, Actors Tatiana Maslany, Amy Matysio and Kevin Sorbo, Saturday Night Live alumni Jerry Minor and Jeff Richards, Eastbound & Down's Steve Little, The Sports Network anchor Jay Onrait, Second City alum Sandy Jobin-Bevans, stand-up comedians Todd Glass, Todd Barry, Kurt Braunohler, and Video On Trial mainstay Debra DiGiovanni.

References

External links
The Sketchersons
The Sketchersons Youtube Channel

Comedians from Toronto
Sketch comedy troupes
Canadian comedy troupes
Canadian Comedy Award winners